Martial Cottle Park is an upcoming park which is being developed as a collaboration between the California Department of Parks and Recreation and Santa Clara County Parks. The park is located on 287.54 acres of land in the city of San Jose, California, U.S.

History
Martial Cottle Park is a 287.54 acre property located in a residential and commercial neighborhood of South San Jose, bounded by Branham Lane, Snell Avenue and Chynoweth Avenue.  An agricultural farm through four generations, the Martial Cottle Park property is now jointly owned by the California Department of Parks and Recreation and County of Santa Clara Parks and Recreation Department.

References

Parks in San Jose, California
Farms in California
Historic farms in the United States